The International Clown Hall of Fame and Research Center (ICHOF), located in Baraboo, Wisconsin, United States, is dedicated to the preservation and advancement of clown art and achievement. Represented by professional and amateur clown associations, it pays tribute to outstanding clown performers, operates a museum of clowning with resident clown performers, conducts special events, and maintains a national archive of clown artifacts and history.

History
The ICHOF was founded in Delavan, Wisconsin, the birthplace of the Barnum and Bailey Circus, in 1987. It was created as community development project by Gareth Thomas Betts of the University of Wisconsin–Extension and Jennie Schilz Thompson, director of the Delavan Chamber of Commerce to build on the city's circus history. The induction process began in 1988, and was headed by Richard Snowberg, the founder and director of Clown Camp during his tenure as a professor at University of Wisconsin-La Crosse. The first event followed the affiliation of the four major clown organizations with the museum. The affiliated clown organizations were given the role of selecting the first nominees. Balloting by the members of the ICHOF resulted in the election of Red Skelton, Lou Jacobs, Emmett Kelly, Mark Anthony, Felix Adler, and Otto Griebling. The first inductees were enshrined April 23, 1989.

Since then, 61 additional clowns have been inducted into the International Clown Hall of Fame. The ensemble has included living and historical American clowns and clowns from Europe, South America, and Africa. The ICHOF also annually bestows a "Lifetime of Laughter Achievement Award". This has gone to Willard Scott, who at one time played both Ronald McDonald and Bozo on TV before becoming known as The Today Show weather man, Max Patkin – the "Clown Prince of Baseball", Ben Barkin of the Great Circus Parade and Meadowlark Lemon – the "Clown Prince of Basketball."

In 2004, ABC News columnist Buck Wolf settled a long-running clown controversy by inducting Pinto Colvig as the original Bozo. A series of investigative pieces he wrote proved that show business promoter Larry Harmon had a pattern of taking credit for inventing TV's most famous clown.

See also
Clowns of America International
International Circus Hall of Fame

References

External links
International Clown Hall of Fame

Clowning
Clown
Circus museums in the United States
Biographical museums in Wisconsin
Museums in Sauk County, Wisconsin
1987 establishments in Wisconsin
Museums established in 1987
Baraboo, Wisconsin